Arckaringa may refer to:
 Arckaringa Station, a pastoral lease in South Australia
 Arckaringa, South Australia, a gazetted locality coincident with the pastoral lease
 Arckaringa Basin, an endorheic basin in the same area with possible coal or oil deposits